Four Major Plays of Chikamatsu is a collection of four major dramas by the famous Japanese playwright Chikamatsu Monzaemon. The four plays were first translated by Donald Keene in 1961, and have appeared in various collections and books over the years; Four Major Plays contains a Preface, an Introduction, and two appendices in addition, and is published by Columbia University Press.

The Preface gives a more popular account of matters, mentioning that Keene's translations of the plays have actually been performed; the lengthy introduction gives a brief biographical sketch of Chikamatsu and a discussion of various literary features and other background useful for understanding Chikamatsu's plays.

Contents

Plays

The Love Suicides at Sonezaki (Sonezaki Shinjū)
The Battles of Coxinga (Kokusenya Kassen)
The Uprooted Pine (Nebiki no Kadomatsu)
The Love Suicides at Amijima (Shinjū Ten no Amijima)

Appendices
The two appendices are:
A Note on Prostitution in Chikamatsu's Plays
Contemporary Puppet Performances of Chikamatsu's Plays

Chikamatsu, Major Plays